The Tempe Union High School District is a school district of high schools in Tempe, Arizona, USA. Its service area includes all of Tempe, the city of Chandler, Arizona west of the Loop 101, Guadalupe, the Gila River Indian Community in Maricopa County, and the Ahwatukee area of Phoenix (the same areas served by the Tempe Elementary School District and the Kyrene School District, both of which feed into Tempe Union).

The district operates six comprehensive high schools, an online school, and in 2023 will open the Innovation Center at the former site of Compadre Academy, which will allow students to earn high school credit solving real world problems. Tempe High School also teaches the International Baccalaureate. Peggy Payne Academy, once an independent 'school-within-a-school' for gifted students, is now a program of McClintock High School.

Governing Board Members 
 Armando Montero (President)
 Amanda Steele (Vice President)
 Sarah James
 Andres Barraza
 Berdetta Hodge

Schools

Feeder Elementary School Districts
 Tempe
 Kyrene

Controversies

Allegations of records falsification 
In 2001, then registrar of Desert Vista High School, Jane Jones, accused the school's principal at the time, Joe McDonald, of approaching three teachers at the schools to change the grades for a student-athlete who was being recruited, but was ineligible to compete at an Division I school. McDonald allegedly approached the teachers after was asked by then School District Superintendent, James Buchanan, to see what can be done to help the student. School district administrators admitted four years later, in 2005, that grades were changed for the softball student-athlete two months after her graduation, after which she was cleared by the National Collegiate Athletic Association to play at Texas A&M University–Corpus Christi.

In 2002, Jones was given her first negative evaluation of her career, and was subsequently fired on McDonald's recommendation. Following her termination, Jones filed a wrongful termination lawsuit under the state's whistleblower protection law, alleging that she was fired because McDonald said she was "not a team player." Subsequently, Jones claimed the school district officials also engaged in retaliation following her dismissal by claiming she was not eligible for rehiring to an investigator working for a California-based reference checking company, thus allegedly implying she has committed wrongdoing. Arizona school districts have no power to determine rehire eligibility, as only the state's Board of Education has the authority to suspend or revoke a person's teaching credentials.

A $140,000 settlement between the district and Jones was approved by a judge in 2006.

Alleged preferential treatment of student-athletes 
In 2004, local newspaper East Valley Tribune reported that a former Desert Vista High School varsity football player, Chris Snow, claimed he was paid by the school district to tutor other student athletes on the team, and in the case of one football player he helped tutor, Snow did 70% to 80% of the work for the player, due to an arrangement made to ensure the player remains eligible for football.

District officials say while the district has a peer tutor program, the district does not pay tutors. The East Valley Tribune, however, claims that Snow's allegations were confirmed by two other sources, which were not identified by name.

See also
 Chandler Unified School District
 Tempe Elementary School District
 Kyrene School District

Notes

External links
 Official Site

School districts in Maricopa County, Arizona
Education in Tempe, Arizona
Education in Chandler, Arizona
1908 establishments in Arizona Territory
School districts established in 1908